Vanya Todorova Kaludova (born 31 January 1969), known professionally as Ivana, is a popular Bulgarian singer. She is one of the most prolific performers in the pop-folk music genre in Bulgaria.

Biography 
Ivana was born on January 31, 1969, in Aytos, Bulgaria. A Svishtov University of Economics graduate, she then briefly studied at the Bourgas Free University, before dropping out. Meanwhile, Ivana was married and had a daughter named Teodora (Теодора).

Career 
Ivana's father worked along the Black Sea coast with his orchestra. One night during a concert, after their lead singer had gotten sick, she was offered to substitute for her, singing several Bulgarian folklore songs. Ivana had great response from the audience and she was immediately offered to perform with the orchestra for the summer. She was 14 years old at the time and really liked being on stage. Later on she formed a band called "Prima +", consisting of herself, Stoyana and Rumen Radoinov. The group was invited to sing at the hotel estate `Prikazkite`, where Ivana’s talent was noticed by Payner music company owner – Mitko Dimitrov, who shortly after offered her to sign a contract with the studio. Vanya Todorova Kaludova adopted the stage name Ivana and it didn't take long before she started making hits. Her first single was `Idol`. The second single - a duet with Kosta Markov, called `Darvo bez koren`(A tree without roots) - was released soon after. Her third single – `100 patrona` (100 bullets), which also served as her debut album title, became one of the biggest hits in the pop-folk genre in Bulgaria and still one of the biggest hits in pop-folk to date. The album was released in 2000, making her one of the hottest names in the music industry in the country. The following 8 years with her work and hits Ivana proved to be one of the biggest Bulgarian stars. Often cited "the people's singer" by the media and her fans, she is loved by many, not only for her music, but also for her cheerful persona and easy communication with her fans.

Discography 
CDs

A Hundred Bullets (in Bulgarian – 100 патрона) (2000)
Ivana – Live (in Bulgarian – Ивана – Live) (2001)
Smells of... love (in Bulgarian -Мирише на... любов) (2003)
No limits (in Bulgarian -Без Граници) (2003)
Non-stop (in Bulgarian – Няма спиране) (2004)
A Dose of love (in Bulgarian – Доза любов) (2005)
Single best collection (2006)
Every day is holiday (in Bulgarian – Празник всеки ден) (2006)
Hit collection – MP3 (2007)
A Sparkle in the eyes (in Bulgarian – Блясък в очите) (2008)
10 years of love... and then some more love (in Bulgarian – 10 години любов... и пак любов) (2010)
I Give no explanations (in Bulgarian – Обяснения не давам) (2012)
Golden hits of Payner 2 – Ivana (in Bulgarian – Златните хитове на Пайнер 2 – Ивана) (2012)
I won't let us give up (in Bulgarian – Не давам да се даваме) (2015)
Still the same, yet not quite (in Bulgarian – Същата и не съвсем) (2019)

DVDs
Ivana – Live (in Bulgarian – Ивана – Live) (2002)
No limits (in Bulgarian – Без Граници) (2004)
Ivana Best Video Selection 1 (2005)
Stars on the stage-live(in Bulgarian -Звезди на сцената-live) (2005)-A concert with the Serbian singer Indira Radić
Ivana Best Video Selection 2 (2007)
Everything is love (in Bulgarian -Всичко е любов) (2008)  
Ivana Live Party (2008)

Awards 
2000 – Debut of the year –  The musical awards of "Нов фолк" magazine
2001 – Best Female Singer –  The musical awards of "Нов фолк" magazine
2002 – Best live singing  –  The musical awards of "Нов фолк" magazine
2003 – Best live singing  –  The musical awards of "Нов фолк" magazine
2003 – Best song of the year   –  The musical awards of "Нов фолк" magazine
2003 – Best Female Singer –  Planeta TV Awards
2004 – Best clip (Нещо НеТипично (Something atypical)) – Planeta TV Awards
2004 – Most loved song of the audience –  Planeta TV Awards
2004 – Best Female Singer –  The musical awards of "Нов фолк" magazine
2004 – Best Female Singer –  Planeta TV Awards
2005 – "Star of the year" –  The awards of "Блясък" magazine
2005 – Best live singing  –  The musical awards of "Нов фолк" magazine
2005 – Album of the year(Няма спиране(Non-stop)) – Planeta TV Awards
2005 – Best Female Singer –  The musical awards of "Нов фолк" magazine
2005 – Best Female Singer –  Planeta TV Awards
2006 – Best Female Singer –  The musical awards of "Нов фолк" magazine
2006 – Best Female Singer –  Planeta TV Awards
2007 – Album of the year(Доза любов(Dose of love)) – Planeta TV Awards
2007 – Superstar(A special award for the best singer in the last 5 years) –  Planeta TV Awards
2008 – Album of the year(Празник всеки ден(Every day is a holiday)) – Planeta TV Awards
2010– The best singer for last 10 years

Tours
In 2005 Ivana and Serbian singer Indira Radić embarked on a mini-tour, performing in 5 Bulgarian cities to great success. She sang her newest and older hits, traditional Bulgarian folk songs and duets with Indira Radić.

In 2005, 2006 and 2007 Ivana toured with 8 other famous Bulgarian singers - including Kamelia, Emilia, Maria, etc - for the Planeta TV and Payner national tours.

"Ivana LIVE Tour USA 2008" took place in Atlantic city, New York, Atlanta, Las Vegas, Tampa, Chicago and Washington. She held seven concerts for the Bulgarians living in the USA.

References

External links 
 Ivana at the catalogue of Payner music 
 The official forum of Ivana
  Professional photos of Ivana

1969 births
Living people
21st-century Bulgarian women singers
Bulgarian folk-pop singers
People from Aytos
Payner artists